VPH may refer to:

Veterinary public health
Vibrations per hour
Virtual Physiological Human
Volatile petroleum hydrocarbons in total petroleum hydrocarbon